STSI can refer to:

 Space Telescope Science Institute, NASA-sponsored institute at Johns Hopkins University
 Sekolah Tinggi Seni Indonesia (disambiguation), several arts universities in Indonesia